Kafr Saad is a city in Damietta Governorate, Egypt. It lies North East of the Nile Delta.

See also

 List of cities and towns in Egypt

References 

Populated places in Damietta Governorate